The phrase "power behind the throne" refers to a person or group that informally exercises the real power of a high-ranking office, such as a head of state. In politics, it most commonly refers to a relative, aide, or nominal subordinate of a political leader (often called a "figurehead") who serves as de facto leader, setting policy through possessing great influence and/or skillful manipulation.

The original concept of a power behind the throne was a Medieval-era figure of speech referring to the fact that the monarch's policies could be set by a counsellor not seated in the throne but standing behind it—perhaps whispering in the monarch's ear—out of common sight. In recent times, family members and official or unofficial advisers might take on a similar role. Sometimes it is difficult to assess whether such an accusation is true or a conspiracy theory.

Historical examples
Historical examples of a "power behind the throne" include:
 Europe
 the Mayor of the Palace under the Merovingian kings in Francia (among the earliest examples of such powerful advisors);
 Chancellor of Germany and Minister President of Prussia Otto von Bismarck, with German Emperor and King of Prussia William I as a de facto figurehead;
 Cardinal Richelieu, the power behind the throne of King Louis XIII of France;
 Marquis of Pombal, a Portuguese statesman and diplomat who effectively ruled the Portuguese Empire from 1750 to 1777 as chief minister to King Joseph I;
 Some royal mistresses.
 East Asia
 Nogai Khan, Mamai and Edigu in the Golden Horde;
 Yeon Gaesomun, Yeon Namsaeng and Yeon Nam-geon, Dae Magniji of the Kingdom of Goguryeo;
 Goryeo military regime in the Kingdom of Goryeo;
 Fujiwara Clan of Heian Period Japan
 Shogun of Feudal Japan. Additionally during the Kamakura Period, the Shogun was effectively a figurehead as well, with real power in hands of the Hōjō clan.
 The Genrō had this role in Meiji period of Japan.
 The Qianlong Emperor held de facto power as the Retired Emperor during the first three years of his son- the Jiaqing Emperor's reign
The Empress Dowager Cixi held total power of the Qing dynasty during the reign of 3 Emperors.
 Another modern example was Deng Xiaoping in China, who was recognized as China's paramount leader without holding the position of either General Secretary, head of state or head of government.
 Southeast Asia
 Trịnh lords of the Later Lê dynasty, Đại Việt.
 Another example is the rule of Pol Pot in Democratic Kampuchea from 1975–79, who led the Khmer Rouge to victory following a devastating civil war.
 King Norodom Sihanouk served as figurehead until his withdrawal in 1976. He returned to reign over Cambodia in 1993, but without executive power.
 South Asia
 In India, an example was Chanakya, the teacher and advisor of Chandragupta Maurya. A modern example is Sonia Gandhi, acting as the real power behind the erstwhile Prime Minister Manmohan Singh. 
 Peshwa of the Maratha Empire, under the Bhat family, they became the de facto leaders of the Maratha Confederacy, with the Chhatrapati becoming a nominal ruler..
 Sarvadhikari, Chief minister of the Kingdom of Mysore.
In the Kingdom of Nepal, from 1846 to 1951, the Rana dynasty reduced the Kings to the status of figurehead, with the post of Prime Minister being transmitted hereditarily
 North America
 In the United States, Edith Wilson—second wife and First Lady of President Woodrow Wilson—took over many of the routine duties and details of the government after her husband was incapacitated by a stroke.
 The Roman Empire - Earlier examples include the magistri militum of the later decades of the Western Roman Empire. Examples of such are
 Stilicho the general of Emperor Honorius,
 Aetius, the power behind the throne of Honorius' nephew Valentinian III,
 Ricimer the puppet master of Emperors Avitus, Majorian, Libius Severus, Procopius Anthemius, and Olybrius,
 and then finally Flavius Orestes, the father of the usurper emperor Romulus Augustulus, and the Germanic chieftain Odoacer, who were the masters in the West during the reigns of Emperor Julius Nepos and then Orestes' son, the aforementioned Romulus. Odoacer then deposed the figurehead Roman ruler, captured and executed Orestes, and established his own Italian kingdom as the Dux Italiae, only to be overthrown by the Ostrogothic chieftain Theodoric on the behest of the Eastern Emperor Zeno.
 Latin America
 an example was Joseph-Marie Córdoba Montoya during the Presidency of Carlos Salinas de Gortari (1988–1994). Córdoba Montoya, a French naturalized Mexican, was the Head of the Office of the Presidency, and was considered the second-most powerful man in Mexico at the time.
 Another example in Latin America is the one of the former general Manuel Noriega, who was the military leader and the de facto chief of state of Panama from 1983 to 1989.
 Diego Portales of Chile, who had significant influence in the political life of his country in early 1830s, reflected in the constitution of 1833;
 The Middle East
 the Crown Prince of Saudi Arabia, Muhammad bin Salman, who effectively rules the country for his -year old father King Salman.
 Mohammed bin Zayed Al Nahyan of Abu Dhabi, who acted on behalf of Emir and President of the UAE Khalifa bin Zayed Al Nahyan after he suffered a stroke in 2014, was often considered the de facto President of the UAE until Khalifa's death in 2022.
 In Qatar, Hamad bin Jassim bin Jaber Al Thani was often called the power behind the throne of Hamad bin Khalifa Al Thani.

Africa 
 Rainiharo, Rainivoninahitriniony and Rainilaiarivony, Commander-in-Chief of the military and the Prime minister of Merina Kingdom.

Related terms
A related term is éminence grise (French: "gray eminence"), a powerful advisor or decision-maker who operates secretly or otherwise unofficially. This phrase originally referred to Cardinal de Richelieu's right-hand man, François Leclerc du Tremblay (also known as the Père Joseph), a Capuchin friar who wore grey robes. Because the Cardinal de Richelieu, the power behind the throne of King Louis XIII of France, as a Catholic cardinal was styled Son Eminence ("His Eminence"), his alter ego Père Joseph was called l'éminence grise (which is also the English title of his biography by Aldous Huxley). Martin Bormann was referred to as the Brown Eminence, brown referring to the brown uniform of the Nazi Party.

The modern usage of the term Proconsul, as analogy for a person from a foreign power manipulating another country's internal affairs, is also referred as the power behind the throne.

See also
 Brain trust
 Cabal
 Cloistered rule
 Éminence grise
 Figurehead
 Ginger group
 Kingmaker
 Kitchen Cabinet
 Shadow government (conspiracy)
 Deep State

References

Deep politics
English phrases
Oligarchy
Control (social and political)
Government institutions
Ethically disputed political practices